Herbert Price Evans (30 August 1894 – 19 November 1982) was a Welsh professional footballer.

Career
Evans was born in Llandaff, Cardiff. He played for Cardiff Corinthians when Cardiff City signed him in 1920 as part of the club's first season in the English Football League. Despite his signing with the club, he remained an amateur player until late into his spell, winning a Wales amateur cap when he played against England in 1922. Later that year, he also made his debut for the senior side on 4 February in a 2–1 win over Scotland.

He eventually turned professional for the club but suffered a broken leg shortly after, and a long recovery kept him out of league football for nearly two years. When he returned, he found his place taken by Harry Wake, and he left to join Tranmere Rovers in 1926, along with Alfie Hagan. However, he broke his other leg a year later and was forced to retire.

Evans was also a keen cricketer and played first-class cricket for Glamorgan in one match in 1922.

References

1894 births
1982 deaths
Welsh footballers
Wales international footballers
Cardiff City F.C. players
Tranmere Rovers F.C. players
English Football League players
Welsh cricketers
Glamorgan cricketers
Wales amateur international footballers
Cardiff Corinthians F.C. players
Association football midfielders